Fire Station No. 14, and variations, may refer to:

 Fire Station No. 14 (Los Angeles, California), historic all-black segregated fire station, listed on the National Register of Historic Places (NRHP)
Fire Station No. 14 (Denver, Colorado), a Denver Landmark
Houston Heights Fire Station, Houston, Texas, NRHP-listed, known also as "Fire Station 14"
 Fire Station No. 14 (Tacoma, Washington), NRHP-listed

See also
List of fire stations